Mark Anthony "Baz" Luhrmann (born 17 September 1962) is an Australian film director, producer, writer and actor. With projects spanning film, television, opera, theatre, music and recording industries, he is regarded by some as a contemporary example of an auteur for his style and deep involvement in the writing, directing, design, and musical components of all his work. He is the most commercially successful Australian director, with four of his films in the top ten highest worldwide grossing Australian films of all time.

On the screen he is best known for his "Red Curtain Trilogy", consisting of his romantic comedy film Strictly Ballroom (1992) and the romantic tragedies William Shakespeare's Romeo + Juliet (1996) and Moulin Rouge! (2001). Following the trilogy, projects included Australia (2008), The Great Gatsby (2013), Elvis (2022), and his television period drama The Get Down (2016) for Netflix. Additional projects include stage productions of Giacomo Puccini's La bohème for both Opera Australia and Broadway, and Strictly Ballroom the Musical (2014).

Luhrmann is equally known for his Grammy-nominated soundtracks for Moulin Rouge! and The Great Gatsby, as well as his record label House of Iona, a co-venture with RCA Records. Serving as producer on all of his musical soundtracks, he also holds writing credits on many of the individual tracks. His album Something for Everybody features music from many of his films and also includes his hit "Everybody's Free (To Wear Sunscreen)".

Early and personal life
Luhrmann was born in Sydney. His mother, Barbara Carmel (née Brennan), was a ballroom dance teacher and dress shop owner, and his father, Leonard Luhrmann, ran a petrol station and a movie theatre. He was raised in Herons Creek, a tiny rural settlement in mid-northern New South Wales. He attended St Joseph's Hastings Regional School, Port Macquarie (1975–1978); St Paul's Catholic College, performing in the school's version of Shakespeare's Henry IV, Part 1, and Narrabeen Sports High School, where he met future collaborator Craig Pearce.

Luhrmann received the nickname "Baz" at school, given to him because of his hair style, the name coming from the puppet character Basil Brush. While still in high school, Luhrmann changed his name by deed poll to Bazmark, joining his nickname and birth name together. In 1980 Luhrmann graduated high school and in the same year was cast opposite Judy Davis in the Australian film Winter of Our Dreams. In 1982 using the money he had earned from film and television experience he funded his own theatre company, The Bond Theatre Company.. The company performed at the Pavilion at Sydney's Bondi Beach. At the same time he conceived and appeared in a controversial television documentary, Kids of the Cross, where Luhrmann, embedded as a character, lived with a group of street kids. In 1983, he began an acting course at the National Institute of Dramatic Art. He graduated in 1985 alongside Sonia Todd, Catherine McClements and Justin Monjo. On 26 January 1997, he married Catherine Martin, a production designer; the couple have two children.

Luhrmann supports the Melbourne Demons in the Australian Football League.

Career

Film

After theatrical successes, including the short play Strictly Ballroom which premiered at the Wharf Theatre, Luhrmann moved into film. He made his directorial debut with the 1992 film version of Strictly Ballroom.

Luhrmann's modern film interpretation Romeo + Juliet (1996), based on the William Shakespeare play and starring Leonardo DiCaprio and Claire Danes, defeated Titanic at the BAFTAs for best direction, music and screenplay. The film was celebrated at the Berlin Film Festival, where it was recognised with the Golden Bear award for direction and Silver Bear for DiCaprio's performance. Luhrmann also produced both volumes of the soundtrack album, which went triple-platinum.

Luhrmann's Oscar-winning musical Moulin Rouge! (2001), set in the Montmartre Quarter of Paris at the dawn of the 20th century, told the story of a young English poet/writer, Christian (Ewan McGregor) who falls in love with the star of the Moulin Rouge, cabaret actress and courtesan Satine (Nicole Kidman). The film was praised by its adherents, including musical directors Robert Wise and Stanley Donen, as having re-invented the modern musical, blending decades of popular music in remixes and mash-ups. The movie was named one of the AFI's top ten films of 2001 and in 2010 was chosen as the top film of the 2000s decade in a poll of 150,000 respondents in the United Kingdom. At the 59th Annual Golden Globes, Moulin Rouge! took home the awards for Best Motion Picture, Best Actress, and Best Original Score. The film also gave birth to a successful soundtrack album, produced by Luhrmann, which sold more than seven million copies and went double-platinum, led by the Grammy-winning number one hit single "Lady Marmalade".

Luhrmann's 2008 historical epic Australia featured some of the country's most celebrated actors, including Nicole Kidman, Hugh Jackman, and David Gulpilil. Situated between the two World Wars, the film blended a nostalgic romance with major events from Australian history, including the Bombing of Darwin, and the true story of the Stolen Generations, wherein thousands of mixed-race Aboriginal children were stolen from their families by the state and forcibly integrated into white society. The movie's racial politics were controversial for their time, and notably, its production coincided with Prime Minister Kevin Rudd's 2008 Apology to Australia's Indigenous peoples. Marcia Langton, professor of Australian indigenous studies at Melbourne University publicly supported the film, saying "Luhrmann depicts with satirical sharpness the racial caste system of that time... In his imagined cinema of the 1940s, the spatial and social shape of racism is reconstructed with such exact detail, I felt I had been transported back to my own childhood." While achieving modest box office success in the United States, the film was very successful in Europe, maintaining the #1 slot at the box office for many weeks in France, Germany, Spain, Italy and the Scandinavian countries. It is the second-highest grossing Australian film of all time, next to Crocodile Dundee and ahead of Happy Feet.

In 2013, Luhrmann adapted F. Scott Fitzgerald's The Great Gatsby, shot in 3D, starring Leonardo DiCaprio as Jay Gatsby, Tobey Maguire as Nick Carraway, Carey Mulligan as Daisy Buchanan, Joel Edgerton as Tom Buchanan, Australian newcomer Elizabeth Debicki as Jordan Baker, and legendary Indian actor Amitabh Bachchan as Meyer Wolfsheim. For the film, Luhrmann and costume/production designer Catherine Martin collaborated with Prada, Brooks Brothers, and Tiffany & Co. to create period-inspired dresses, suits, and jewellery based on their own archives and true to the book's own references to luxury brands. The film grossed over $353 million worldwide, making it the director's highest-grossing movie to date. Critic Richard Roeper described the adaptation as "the best attempt yet to capture the essence of the novel" while Fitzgerald's granddaughter praised the movie, saying "Scott would have been proud." The following year, at the 86th Academy Awards, the film won in both of its nominated categories: Best Production Design and Best Costume Design. The soundtrack, produced by Luhrmann, Anton Monsted, and Jay-Z, sought to blend the music of the Jazz Age with contemporary hip hop as two historical analogues. Featured artists included Beyoncé, Jack White, Lana Del Rey, Sia, will.i.am, The xx, and Florence and the Machine; the soundtrack also included score from the film's composer and Luhrmann's repeat collaborator Craig Armstrong. The album's sales exceeded expectations, marking the biggest digital sales week for a soundtrack in Billboard history, and peaking at number one on the US Billboard 200 chart.

Luhrmann's next project was a film about Elvis Presley's relationship with Colonel Tom Parker, simply called Elvis, which debuted at the Cannes Film Festival in May 2022. Tom Hanks played Parker and Austin Butler portrayed Presley, having been cast after a series of screen tests, as well as music and performance workshops. The film opened in June 2022, becoming a box office hit and receiving eight Academy Award nominations, including Best Picture and Best Actor for Butler. In January 2023, Luhrmann signed a first-look deal with Warner Bros. Pictures after working with the studio on Elvis.

Television

In 2016, Luhrmann collaborated with award-winning playwright Stephen Adly Guirgis on the Netflix series The Get Down about the birth of hip hop in the 1970s. For the series, Luhrmann brought on Nas, Grandmaster Flash, Kurtis Blow and DJ Kool Herc as producers, to help tell the story of the rise of hip hop, punk, and disco during shifting cultural and political transformation through his unique brand of magical realism. The series featured two parts, praised for its vibrant music, fresh cast and authenticity, due to the involvement of many of the era's key historical figures in central roles to the show's development. Part One was certified fresh by Rotten Tomatoes, with a score of 77%, while Part Two of the series holds a critic score of 86%.

Filmography

Director credits

Screen actor
Television

Film

Stage actor

Other work

1981: A young Luhrmann can be seen in an early acting role in the film Winter of Our Dreams, directed by John Duigan. Luhrmann has a small part playing opposite Judy Davis.
1992: Luhrmann directed a video for John Paul Young's "Love Is in the Air", which was rereleased to coincide with the release of Strictly Ballroom in which the song was featured prominently.
1993: Luhrmann staged his interpretation of Benjamin Britten's version of A Midsummer Night's Dream, set in colonial India, for the Australian Opera. After successful seasons in Sydney and Melbourne, the production went on to win the Critics' Prize at the Edinburgh Festival. Music extracts can be heard on his album Something for Everybody.
1993: Luhrmann assisted in the election campaign of former Australian prime minister Paul Keating.
1997: The CD of Something for Everybody was released, featuring music from Luhrmann's films and operas including his version of Britten's A Midsummer Night's Dream. Moreover, Luhrmann created his own company with his wife Catherine Martin: .
1997: As a music producer, Luhrmann is credited with "Everybody's Free (To Wear Sunscreen)", a successful spoken word song in Europe, Australia and the Americas.
2002: Luhrmann brought his production of Puccini's La bohème to the Broadway Theatre in New York City. Originally produced for Opera Australia in Sydney in 1990, once in New York it eventually received seven Tony Award nominations, including Best Revival of a Musical, Best Direction (Luhrmann), Best Orchestrations (Nicholas Kitsopoulos), Best Costume Design (Catherine Martin), and winning Best Set Design (Catherine Martin), Best Lighting Design (Nigel Levings), and the Tony Honors for Excellence in Theatre for the Principal Ensemble Cast.
2004: Luhrmann directed a lavish multimillion-dollar commercial for Chanel N° 5 titled N° 5 the Film, inspired by his Red Curtain Trilogy, starring Nicole Kidman and Rodrigo Santoro. On the Charlie Rose interview show he told Rose that he based the commercial on the 1953 film Roman Holiday.
2005: Luhrmann was appointed an Ambassador for the Australian Theatre for Young People.
2008: Luhrmann was asked by the Prime Minister of Australia Kevin Rudd to make new advertisements to promote Australia as a tourist destination.
2009: At the 81st Academy Awards in February, Luhrmann put together a number dedicated to musicals which consisted of Hugh Jackman, Beyoncé, Zac Efron, Vanessa Hudgens, Dominic Cooper and Amanda Seyfried.
2009: In September, Luhrmann made an appearance as a guest judge on Dancing with the Stars.
2010: Luhrmann and the painter Vincent Fantauzzo embarked on an art initiative which took them to India, where they created artworks on walls of hotels, in the streets of Rajasthan and on 17th century forts.
2017: Luhrmann shot the campaign film The Secret Life of Flowers for the collaboration between Erdem and H&M.
2019: Though mostly hands-off with the stage production of Moulin Rouge!, Luhrmann produced its Broadway cast recording.

Influence and legacy 
Luhrmann has cited Italian grand opera as a major influence on his work and has also given a nod to other theatrical styles, such as Bollywood films, as having influenced his style. Luhrmann was a ballroom dancer as a child and his mother taught ballroom dancing which was an inspiration for Strictly Ballroom. Luhrmann's favourite films are Star 80, 8½, War and Peace, Medium Cool and Fitzcarraldo.

Luhrmann's influence has extended outside the traditional realm of media and entertainment. Deeply involved in the fashion and art worlds, Luhrmann's No. 5 the Film for Chanel not only holds a Guinness World Record for the highest budget for an advertising commercial ever produced, but pioneered the now commonplace genre of fashion film and branded content. Luhrmann works closely with the Metropolitan Museum of Art's Anna Wintour Costume Center, having chaired the annual Met Gala as well as producing a short film for the museum, celebrating Miuccia Prada and Elsa Schiaparelli. More recently he and his wife Catherine Martin have adapted their style for projects in events, retail, architecture and design with Barneys New York and developer and hotelier Alan Faena.

In November 2022 Lurhmann featured in Desert Island Discs on BBC Radio 4.

Awards and honours

Media appearances 
In September 2009, Luhrmann made an appearance as a guest judge on Dancing with the Stars. Luhrmann participated on the NPR radio quiz program Wait Wait... Don't Tell Me! in 2013.
Luhrmann's song "Everybody's Free (To Wear Sunscreen)" was discussed in March 2020 on the BBC Radio 5 Live Chiles on Friday programme with Charlotte McDonald. It featured an interview from the documentary with Australian voice over artist, Lee Perry.

In culture
In 2021, the Israeli writers of The Jews Are Coming made a tribute in Hebrew to "Everybody's Free (To Wear Sunscreen)" with Moses standing before the Israelites and quoting the Ten Commandments with the background music from "Sunscreen" and several parts closely translated from Luhrmann's text, such as getting to know your parents before they disappear.

References

External links

 
 
 
 

1962 births
Living people
ARIA Award winners
Australian film directors
Australian opera directors
Australian film producers
Australian screenwriters
Best Adapted Screenplay BAFTA Award winners
Best Director BAFTA Award winners
European Film Awards winners (people)
English-language film directors
National Institute of Dramatic Art alumni
Actors from Sydney
Tony Award winners
Postmodernist filmmakers